Willem Johannes Maria (Pim) Levelt (born 17 May 1938 in Amsterdam) is a Dutch psycholinguist. He is a researcher of human language acquisition and speech production. He developed a comprehensive theory of the cognitive processes involved in the act of speaking, including the significance of the "mental lexicon". Levelt was the founding director of the Max Planck Institute for Psycholinguistics in Nijmegen. He also served as president of the Royal Netherlands Academy of Arts and Sciences between 2002 and 2005, of which he has been a member since 1978.

Levelt became a member of the German National Academy of Sciences Leopoldina in 1993. In 2000 he became a foreign associate of the National Academy of Sciences of the United States. Levelt became a corresponding member (living abroad) of the Austrian Academy of Sciences in 2002. He was elected to the American Philosophical Society in 2004. In 2010 Levelt was awarded the Orden Pour le Mérite für Wissenschaften und Künste, receiving the orden in person from the President of Germany on 30 May 2011.

Publications 
 
 
 
 
 

 About Pim Levelt

References

External links
Willem Levelt's résumé published by the Max Planck Institute for Psycholinguistics

1938 births
Living people
Corresponding Members of the Austrian Academy of Sciences
Fellows of the Cognitive Science Society
Foreign associates of the National Academy of Sciences
Knights Commander of the Order of Merit of the Federal Republic of Germany
Leiden University alumni
Linguists from the Netherlands
Members of the German Academy of Sciences Leopoldina
Members of the Royal Netherlands Academy of Arts and Sciences
Psycholinguists
Academic staff of Radboud University Nijmegen
Recipients of the Pour le Mérite (civil class)
Scientists from Amsterdam
Academic staff of the University of Groningen

Members of the American Philosophical Society